Kaukapakapa is a town in the North Island of New Zealand. It is situated in the Rodney ward of the Auckland Region and is around 50 kilometres (31 miles) northwest of Auckland city. State Highway 16 passes through the town, connecting it to Helensville about 12 km (7.5 miles) to the south-west, and Araparera about 14 km to the north. The North Auckland Line also passes through Kaukapakapa. The Kaukapakapa River flows from the town to the Kaipara Harbour to the west.

"Kaukapakapa" is a Māori name meaning "to swim with much splashing".
The town is commonly known to the locals in its shortened form "Kaukap".

History 
European settlement of the area began in 1860, when the Government bought land from local Māori. A small number of settlers arrived from England and Scotland, and a Methodist church was built in 1872. A monthly boat service operated between Kaukapakapa and the northern Kaipara from 1863. The population of the area was 311 in 1881. The town developed split between the northern and southern banks of the river. Although roads connected the town to Riverhead, Tauhoa and Helensville by the early 1880s, they were of poor quality, and most access was by the river. The roads were still mostly unmetalled in 1920.

The kauri timber industry was responsible for developing the area, with logs floated down the Kaukapakapa River to the Kaipara Harbour, where they were loaded onto ships for export. Kauri gum digging (beginning in 1873-74 and continuing until at least 1914) and flax processing (in the 1880s) were also significant early industries. A shipyard operated from 1864 and into the 1880s.

The North Auckland railway line reached Kaukapakapa in 1889. A creamery was built next to the railway station to service the developing dairy industry.

In 2008 Genesis Energy proposed building a gas-fired power station called Rodney Power Station near Kaukapakapa. Despite local opposition, the project was granted resource consent in 2009. The project was abandoned in 2015.

Demographics
The settlement is part of the larger Te Kuru statistical area.

Kaukapakapa had a population of 873 at the 2018 New Zealand census, an increase of 264 people (43.3%) since the 2013 census, and an increase of 333 people (61.7%) since the 2006 census. There were 270 households, comprising 426 males and 444 females, giving a sex ratio of 0.96 males per female, with 228 people (26.1%) aged under 15 years, 150 (17.2%) aged 15 to 29, 435 (49.8%) aged 30 to 64, and 69 (7.9%) aged 65 or older.

Ethnicities were 93.1% European/Pākehā, 11.7% Māori, 2.4% Pacific peoples, 3.1% Asian, and 2.4% other ethnicities. People may identify with more than one ethnicity.

Although some people chose not to answer the census's question about religious affiliation, 60.8% had no religion, 30.9% were Christian, 1.0% had Māori religious beliefs, 0.3% were Buddhist and 1.7% had other religions.

Of those at least 15 years old, 120 (18.6%) people had a bachelor's or higher degree, and 75 (11.6%) people had no formal qualifications. 195 people (30.2%) earned over $70,000 compared to 17.2% nationally. The employment status of those at least 15 was that 399 (61.9%) people were employed full-time, 93 (14.4%) were part-time, and 21 (3.3%) were unemployed.

Te Kuru statistical area

Te Kuru had a population of 2,484 at the 2018 New Zealand census, an increase of 474 people (23.6%) since the 2013 census, and an increase of 789 people (46.5%) since the 2006 census. There were 792 households, comprising 1,233 males and 1,251 females, giving a sex ratio of 0.99 males per female. The median age was 38.8 years (compared with 37.4 years nationally), with 561 people (22.6%) aged under 15 years, 414 (16.7%) aged 15 to 29, 1,254 (50.5%) aged 30 to 64, and 255 (10.3%) aged 65 or older.

Ethnicities were 93.4% European/Pākehā, 11.2% Māori, 2.4% Pacific peoples, 2.7% Asian, and 2.3% other ethnicities. People may identify with more than one ethnicity.

The percentage of people born overseas was 21.1, compared with 27.1% nationally.

Although some people chose not to answer the census's question about religious affiliation, 61.2% had no religion, 27.7% were Christian, 0.5% had Māori religious beliefs, 0.2% were Hindu, 0.7% were Buddhist and 1.9% had other religions.

Of those at least 15 years old, 348 (18.1%) people had a bachelor's or higher degree, and 255 (13.3%) people had no formal qualifications. The median income was $42,400, compared with $31,800 nationally. 513 people (26.7%) earned over $70,000 compared to 17.2% nationally. The employment status of those at least 15 was that 1,122 (58.3%) people were employed full-time, 327 (17.0%) were part-time, and 45 (2.3%) were unemployed.

Governance 
Kaukapakapa is part of the local government Rodney Ward of Auckland Council and is part of the Kumeu subdivision of the Rodney Local Board.

Kaukapakapa is in the Kaipara ki Mahurangi parliamentary electorate.

Economy 
The township is in the North West Country Inc business improvement district zone. The business association which represents businesses from Kaukapakapa to Riverhead.

Education

Kaukapakapa School is a coeducational full primary school (years 1-8), with a roll of  students as of  The school celebrated its 125th reunion in 1998.

Kaukapakapa also has two early learning institutions: The Kaukapakapa Pre-School, located near the primary school, and a Playcentre located in Macky Road. (Established in 1976)

Publications
Kaukapakapa's only local publication dedicated to Kaukapakapa news and events is the Kaukapakapa Kourier, a free newsletter delivered to local residents by post and also available online in PDF format.

Notable people
 Alan Gibbs - businessman and art collector.
 Tony Woodcock – former All Black rugby player

References

Rodney Local Board Area
Populated places in the Auckland Region
Populated places around the Kaipara Harbour
Populated places on the Kaipara River